The Stade Alfred Marie-Jeanne, until August 2011 Stade En Camée, is a multi-purpose stadium located in Rivière-Pilote, Martinique, an overseas department of France. It is currently used mostly for football matches and is set to be utilized as a venue for the 2010 Caribbean Championship.

References

Football venues in Martinique
Multi-purpose stadiums in France
Sports venues completed in 1991